The discography of the American hip hop group Above The Law consists of seven studio albums, one extended play and thirteen singles.

Albums

Studio albums

Extended plays

Singles

Guest appearances

Production credits

References

External links 
Above The Law discography at Discogs

Hip hop discographies
Discographies of American artists